is a passenger railway station in the town of Ōizumi, Gunma, Japan, operated by the private railway operator Tōbu Railway. It is numbered "TI-46".

Lines

Station layout

The station consists of a single dead-headed island platform connected to the station building by a footbridge.

Platforms

Adjacent stations

History
The first station was originally opened to serve the Koizumi plant of Nakajima Aircraft Company as a station of Sengoku-Kashi Freight Line operated by Tōbu Railway company on December 1, 1941. There were 32 services of a day between Nishi-Koizumi station and Ōta Station.

From March 17, 2012, station numbering was introduced on all Tōbu lines, with Nishi-Koizumi Station becoming "TI-46".

Passenger statistics
In fiscal 2019, the station was used by an average of 1523 passengers daily (boarding passengers only).

Surrounding area
Sanyo Electric factory
Subaru Ōizumi factory
 Ōizumi Town Hall
 Oizumi College of Social Workers

See also
List of railway stations in Japan

References
 Zenkoku Tetsudo Jijo Daikenkyu  
 Ekisha Saihakken  
 Tetsudo Haisen Ato o Aruku

External links

 Tobu station information 
	

Tobu Koizumi Line
Stations of Tobu Railway
Railway stations in Gunma Prefecture
Railway stations in Japan opened in 1941
Ōizumi, Gunma